William Cullen Battle (October 9, 1920 – May 31, 2008) was an American diplomat, lawyer, businessman, United States Ambassador to Australia, and president of the United States Golf Association.

Early life and education
Battle was born in Charlottesville, Virginia on October 9, 1920. He was the son of John S. Battle, former Governor of Virginia (1950–54). While attending the University of Virginia, Battle played on the varsity golf team, until his graduation in 1941.

Battle served in the U.S. Navy during World War II and was awarded the Silver Star. He was in the same squadron in the South Pacific as John F. Kennedy and participated in Kennedy's rescue from the island on which he and his crew were marooned.

After the war, he returned to the University of Virginia, earned a law degree in 1947, and was admitted to the Virginia bar.

Career
Battle worked in his father's law firm, as well as helped his father win election as Governor of Virginia in 1950. During the Massive Resistance crisis, both Battles represented the Albemarle County Public Schools, who were being sued by the NAACP on behalf of parents who wanted their children to attend integrated schools. After joint decisions of the Virginia Supreme Court and three-judge federal panel on January 19, 1959, undercut the Massive Resistance laws, known as the Stanley Plan (which, among other provisions, proposed closing any public school acceding to a court desegregation order), Battle ultimately negotiated a settlement with the NAACP, and Charlottesville public schools reopened.

The younger Battle later worked on Kennedy's 1960 presidential campaign and was appointed Ambassador to Australia, serving from 1962 to 1964.

In 1969, in an election that became known for the crumbling of the Massive Resistance and the Byrd Organization, Battle, the Democrats' gubernatorial candidate, lost to Linwood Holton. Holton who later put his children in Richmond's mostly African-American public schools, became the first Republican governor of the Commonwealth since the end of the Reconstruction Era.

Battle later became president and CEO of Fieldcrest Mills, a textile manufacturer, where he served as president from 1971 to 1981.

In 1978, Battle was elected to the executive committee of the United States Golf Association where he served until 1989. He served as USGA President from 1988 to 1989. He was also president of the Mid-Atlantic Golf Association in 1953.

Personal life and death
Battle died in Charlottesville, Virginia after suffering a stroke. He was survived by his wife Barry (née Webb) Battle, three children, Cullen Battle, Robert Battle and Janie Battle Richards, and six grandchildren.

External links

Daily Progress obituary
WCAV TV (Charlottesville) obituary
USGA obituary

1920 births
2008 deaths
Businesspeople from Charlottesville, Virginia
20th-century American lawyers
20th-century American businesspeople
Ambassadors of the United States to Australia
Golf administrators
Recipients of the Silver Star
McGuireWoods people